The 96th Regiment Illinois Volunteer Infantry was an infantry regiment that served in the Union Army during the American Civil War.

Service
The 96th Illinois Infantry was organized at Rockford, Illinois, and mustered into Federal service on September 6, 1862. It consisted of men from Jo Daviess County and Lake County, Illinois.  The composition of the companies were drawn from a hat with Companies, A, E, F, H, I, and K going to Jo Daviess with B, C, D, and G filled by Lake County men.  The original officers were Colonel Thomas E. Champion of Warren, Illinois, and Lieutenant Colonel Issac L. Clarke of Waukegan, Illinois.

The regiment was mustered out on June 10, 1865.

Total strength and casualties
The regiment suffered 5 officers and 111 enlisted men who were killed in action or who died of their wounds and 1 officer and 124 enlisted men who died of disease, for a total of 241 fatalities.

Commanders
 Colonel Thomas E. Champion - Mustered out with the regiment.
 Lieutenant Colonel John C. Smith – brevet brigadier general
 Sargent / Captain  Wallace William Abbey - Quartermaster, Company K from Warren, Jo Davis County, Illinois.   Later accepted a promotion to Captain.  Mustered out of company K.

Records
The Lake County Discovery Museum in Wauconda, Illinois, maintains many records associated with the regiment at their Lake County History Archives. Their records collection focuses on Company B, and includes letters and photographs from the Young and Minto families.

See also
List of Illinois Civil War Units
Illinois in the American Civil War

Notes

References
 
The Civil War Archive
Adjutant General's Report https://web.archive.org/web/20110525194659/http://civilwar.ilgenweb.net/history/096.html

Units and formations of the Union Army from Illinois
1862 establishments in Illinois
Military units and formations established in 1862
Military units and formations disestablished in 1865